Solemyida is an order of bivalve molluscs.

Families in the order Solemyida
 Manzanellidae Chronic, 1952
 Solemyidae J. E. Gray, 1840

References

 Powell A. W. B., New Zealand Mollusca, William Collins Publishers Ltd, Auckland, New Zealand 1979 

 
Bivalve orders